Jean-François Labbé (born June 15, 1972) is a Canadian former professional ice hockey goaltender who played 15 games in the National Hockey League with the New York Rangers and the Columbus Blue Jackets between 2000 and 2003.

Playing career
As a youth, he played in the 1984 and 1986 Quebec International Pee-Wee Hockey Tournaments with a minor ice hockey team from Sherbrooke.

After playing four seasons in the Quebec Major Junior Hockey League, Labbé began a very successful American Hockey League career.  He played for the Prince Edward Island Senators, Cornwall Aces, Hershey Bears, Hamilton Bulldogs, Hartford Wolf Pack and Syracuse Crunch in his AHL tenure.  His best season came in 1996–1997 with the Hershey Bears, when he won both the Hap Holmes Memorial Award for lowest goals against average and the Les Cunningham Award for league MVP. Labbé won the Calder Cup with the Hartford Wolf Pack in 2000.

Labbé appeared in 15 NHL games: one with the New York Rangers at the end of the 1999–2000 season and 14 with the Columbus Blue Jackets during the 2001–02 and 2002–03 seasons.

He played for the Saint-Georges Garaga in the Ligue Nord-Américaine de Hockey in 2003–2004 after a short stint with the Tolyatti Lada in the Russian Hockey Super League.

Labbé has played in the DEL for three seasons, with Augsburger Panther in 2004–05 and with the Sinupret Ice Tigers in 2005–06 and 2006–07. For the 2008 and 2009 season he joined the Vienna Capitals in Austria's Erste Bank Hockey League.

He finished his career in 2011 after a season with the Sherbrooke Saint-François in the Ligue Nord-Américaine de Hockey.

Labbé was selected for induction as part of the American Hockey League Hall of Fame's 2016 class.

Records
Labbé currently holds records with the Syracuse Crunch for:
Lowest GAA in a single season - 2.18 (2001–02)
Highest single season save percentage - .928 (2001–02)
Career shutouts - 11

Career statistics

Regular season and playoffs

Awards and honours

References

External links

1972 births
Augsburger Panther players
Canadian expatriate ice hockey players in Austria
Canadian expatriate ice hockey players in Germany
Canadian expatriate ice hockey players in Russia
Canadian ice hockey goaltenders
Columbus Blue Jackets players
Cornwall Aces players
Flint Generals players
French Quebecers
Hamilton Bulldogs (AHL) players
Hartford Wolf Pack players
HC Lada Togliatti players
Hershey Bears players
Hull Olympiques players
Ice hockey people from Quebec
Living people
New York Rangers players
Nürnberg Ice Tigers players
Prince Edward Island Senators players
Sherbrooke Faucons players
Sinupret Ice Tigers players
Sportspeople from Sherbrooke
Syracuse Crunch players
Thunder Bay Senators players
Trois-Rivières Draveurs players
Undrafted National Hockey League players
Vienna Capitals players